The 2022–23 season is the 91st season in the existence of Stade de Reims and the club's fifth consecutive season in the top flight of French football. In addition to the domestic league, Reims participated in this season's edition of the Coupe de France. The season covers the period from 1 July 2022 to 30 June 2023.

Players

First-team squad

Transfers

Loans in

Loans out

Pre-season and friendlies

Competitions

Overall record

Ligue 1

League table

Results summary

Results by round

Matches 
The league fixtures were announced on 17 June 2022.

Coupe de France

References 

Stade de Reims seasons
Reims